Correspondence (A Fiction) is second studio album by Levi the Poet, and he released the album on November 17, 2014.

Critical reception

Jordan Gonzales, giving the album three and a half stars for HM Magazine, writes, "Correspondence is a chaotic and beautiful mess of supercharged spoken word set to a documentary soundtrack of a backbone that avoids clichés." Awarding the album four and a half stars from Jesus Freak Hideout, Mark Rice states, "this album contains all the tools necessary for it to do so; a compelling story, an emotive score, superb writing, excellent delivery, and thoughtful content." Scott Fryberger, rating the album four and a half stars at Jesus Freak Hideout, says, "This is one of Levi's finest releases; if you're a fan of his or a fan of wonderful storytelling, this is an album for you." Giving the album four stars by Indie Vision Music, Ian Zandi describes, "While the stories may have depressing notes, he tells it like it is. Honest."

Track listing

References

2014 albums
Levi the Poet albums
2010s spoken word albums
Spoken word albums by American artists